Quezon City Science High School (also referred as QueSci or Kisay) is the Regional Science High School for the National Capital Region. It is the premier science high school of Quezon City, and is regarded as one of the prestigious sciences triumvirate of the Republic of the Philippines along with the Philippine Science High School and Manila Science High School. It is located at Bago-Bantay, Quezon City, Philippines. Founded in 1967, it was appointed as the Regional Science High School for the National Capital Region since 1998.

It holds the distinction as one of the national leaders in the field of Mathematics competitions, being among the country's most consistent schools in terms of its performance in the DepEd-sponsored MTAP contests the past decades. In 2004, it shot to international acclaim when a group of its student-researchers received the fourth Grand Award in the Intel International Science and Engineering fair held in Portland, Oregon. The school continues to excel in producing quality research papers. It's the home of two of the best secondary papers in the Philippines. It's also renowned as a center of excellence for its Spanish elective.

History 
B. Soriano, the Chief of Special Services, conceived the establishment of a science high school in Quezon City. This idea was announced by Alfredo J. Andal, the City Schools Superintendent in 1967.

July 31, 1967, through a memorandum issued to all principals and head teachers, Mrs. Hermenegilda G. Margate, Mathematics and Science Supervisor, was designated by the City Superintendent of Schools to organize and take charge of the Quezon City Science High School.

At first, the school shared a campus with Judge Juan Luna High School at San Francisco Del Monte; in 1969, the school moved to the present site of the Quezon City General Hospital, formerly the San Jose Seminary.

In 1969, the Quezon City Council through the leadership of the then Vice Mayor Ismael A. Mathay, Jr. donated the present school site, measuring 2.4 hectares under Quezon City Government with TCT# 265553 in Barangay Sto. Cristo, Bago Bantay, Quezon City in 1969.

In June 1999, Quezon City Science High School was declared as the Regional Science High School for the National Capital Region by virtue of DECS Order No. 58, series 1999 in consonance with R.A. 8496 (An Act to Establish the Philippine Science High School System and Providing Funds Therefore).

Admission 
Applicants must have at least a grade of 85 in major subjects (Sciences, Math, English) and at least 83 in minor subjects to be able to take the entrance exam. In the first screening, applicants must achieve a score of at least 75%. In order to pass the second screening, an applicant must be in the top 250 of the examinees. The Third, and last, Screening is an interview.

Clubs, Electives, and Varsities 
Clubs are not required in the curriculum, however, the different clubs are offered to those who are interested.

Incomplete list of clubs:

Handled by the AP Department:

 Supreme Student Government - The official governing student body of the whole school.
 Curriculum Year Level (Past) - I, II, III, IV, (Present) - 7, 8, 9, and 10 Officers - The set of officers per batch for a school year.
 Interact Xientia - The official AP club/QCSHS Debate Society.

Handled by the MAPEH Department:

 Indak Xientia - The official dance club of the school.
 Himig Scientia - The official school Choir.
 Sining Scientia - art club
 Sports Club - Handles sports-related affairs.

Handled by the Mathematics Department:

 QCSHS Mathematics League

Handled by the Science Department:

 Young Scientist's Guild (YSG)
 Young Astronomer's Guild
 Science Club
 Youth for Environment in Schools Organization (YES-O)
 Ecosavers Club

Publication:

 The Electron (English)
 Ang Banyuhay (Filipino)

Other clubs include the English Club, Filipino Club, ICT Club, and the Math Club.

Achievements 
Quezon City Science High School was named the Regional Science High School for the National Capital Region. Students also reign in different quiz bees on various subjects throughout the country. Placing and reigning over quiz bees abroad also happens a lot during every school year, especially in core science subject areas (Biology, Physics, Chemistry etc.).

Students also succeed in the field of research. They gain awards locally and internationally throughout every year as they make it to competitions like I-SWEEEP, INESPO, INEPO, Intel-ISEF, and many others.

The school papers also marks the school, being the champion of the whole country in the National Schools Press Conference (NSPC) in 2001. Awards are still being secured every year. The Electron (English publication) and Banyuhay (Filipino Publication) held the District Press Conference championship title for the 14th consecutive year in 2009. They are two of the best secondary school papers in the Philippines.

The school publications received awards in the recently concluded National Schools Press Conference 2012 participated in by more than 5,000 schools in the country. Banyuhay (The Filipino newsletter) reaped two first-place, one second-place, and two third-place trophies, making it once again the country's Best Secondary School Publication for the Filipino Category. Meanwhile, The Electron was also adjudged as One of the Ten Best Secondary School Papers in the Philippines for the English Category.

Quezon City Science High holds the 2008 Association of Science Educators of the Philippines (ASEP) National Science Competition Quiz Bee Championships in Physics, won by Ricardo Raphael Julian, Chemistry, won by Nikita P. Bacalzo Jr., and Second Place in Biology, won by Sebastian Maria B. Sagadal, held in Sta. Cruz, Laguna, Southern Tagalog Region. It also takes pride of the 16th International Environmental Project Olympiad (INEPO) Gold Medalists, Avril Bries and Howell Henrian Bayona, for their projects in the Production of Ethanol from Pineapple Peelings and Power from Cow Manure through a Microbial Fuel.

Facilities 
Quezon City Science High School can be found at the back of SM City North EDSA (Behind Interior Zone). QueSci has a parking lot that snakes around the inside of the campus, 2 gates (Scientian/Golden Acres Road & Misamis St.), and 9 buildings.

Controversy 

In 2009, during the sacking of publications supervised by adviser Rex San Diego, several students vented their angst in the Internet against principal Zenaida Sadsad. Several students created blogs targeting the school administration and its anomalous policies. These students criticised the partial policies being implemented in the school as well as the administration's oppression towards dissenting opinions. These blogs earned the students sanctions, which took toll when four students were suspended for more than a week.

In 2013, a complaint affidavit was filed against Dr. Zenaida Sadsad. The affidavit includes the issues of: 1) accepting student applicants who did not actually meet the grade requirement of QCSHS. 2) openly endorsing Brainworks/Brainchamps Tutorial Learning Center to QCSHS student applicants, with the assurance of guaranteed admission slot in the school. The center boasts of 100% passing rate to the said science high school. 3) leaking out periodical test questions to said tutorial center. 4) threatening teachers who are spreading the issue of the test leakage with a libel suit and removal from service. Dr. Sadsad was temporarily moved to another school on the months of January to March 2010. She resumed office on April until her permanent transfer on September 30, 2013.

References

Regional Science High School Union
Science high schools in Metro Manila
Public schools in Metro Manila
Schools in Quezon City
Educational institutions established in 1967
1967 establishments in the Philippines